Rocky the Musical (originally Rocky: Das Musical)  is a 2012 musical with music by Stephen Flaherty, lyrics by Lynn Ahrens, and a book by Thomas Meehan and Sylvester Stallone, based on the 1976 film of the same name written by Stallone. The show held its world premiere in Hamburg in 2012 and opened on Broadway in 2014 at the Winter Garden Theatre.

Background
The musical is based on the 1976 film Rocky, with a screenplay by Sylvester Stallone. The film itself was made on a budget of $1,075,000, shot in 28 days and was a sleeper hit, earning $225 million in global box office receipts becoming the highest-grossing film of 1976 and went on to win three Oscars, including Best Picture. Having been in the works for eight years, a workshop was held in New York City in April 2011, with Andy Karl playing Rocky and Lisa Brescia playing Adrian. Following the reading it was officially confirmed in November by producer Sylvester Stallone alongside boxers and co-producers Vitali and Wladimir Klitschko, that the show would receive its world premiere in Hamburg in November 2012.

The musical, which premiere production cost around $20 million to produce, has a book by Thomas Meehan and Sylvester Stallone, adapted from Stallone's screenplay, and is directed by Alex Timbers, with choreography by Kelly Devine, boxing choreography by Steven Hoggett, set design by Christopher Barreca, costume design by David Zinn, lighting design by Christopher Akerlind, sound design by Peter Hylenski, video design by Pablo N. Molina and special effects by Jeremy Chernick. A mostly original score has been penned, by Lynn Ahrens with music by Stephen Flaherty.

The show's set, which for Broadway cost $4.3 million, is set around a mostly bare stage which represents the Gym that Rocky trains in. The production uses sliding box-like sets to represent the homes of the characters and the sliding element goes on to include a full sized regulation boxing ring. Audience members seated within the front stalls Golden Circle seating section, are escorted onto the stage for the final 20 minutes to sit on bleacher style seats, in doing so this allows the boxing ring to enter the auditorium and sit in rows A-F, bringing the audience close to the final fight scene.

Production history

Hamburg (2012)
Rocky the Musical received its world premiere on 18 November 2012, at the Operettenhaus, Hamburg. The production opened to positive reviews and title casting included Drew Sarich as Rocky Balboa, Wietske van Tongeren playing Adrian Pennino and Terence Archie playing Apollo Creed. Having been written in English, the show was translated into German for its world premiere.

Broadway (2014)

On 28 April 2013, it was announced the show would transfer to Broadway in February 2014. On 26 August, it was announced that the show would open on 13 March 2014, at the Winter Garden Theatre, with previews commencing on 11 February 2014. The first preview was cancelled as a result of delayed technical rehearsals, due to power problems in the area. Following a scheduled rehearsal day previews commenced on 13 February. Tickets went on sale on 8 September 2013, with title casting announced shortly after, with Andy Karl playing Rocky,  Margo Seibert playing Adrian and Terence Archie transferring from the Hamburg production, to reprise his role as Apollo Creed. Rehearsals for the production began on 18 December 2013, nearly two months prior to opening. The cast performed as part of the ceremony for the 68th Tony Awards in June 2014.  It was announced on 15 July 2014 that the show would close on 17 August 2014, after a run of 28 previews and 188 performances.

Scrapped Korean production
The Korean production, first announced in early 2016, was scheduled to open on October 29 of that year. However, after low ticket sales and  production difficulties, the production was cancelled the day before the premiere. The announcement was heavily criticized, especially by the actors who were only notified of the cancellation via phone call.

Prague (2017)
Rocky the Musical came to Prague for a short 4-to-5 month run. It was performed at the Prague Congress Centre.

Music
The show features 20 original songs, with additional music taken from the original film series including "Eye of the Tiger" and "Gonna Fly Now". The Broadway production of the musical uses a large twenty-member orchestra consisting of guitars, drums, bass, percussion, keyboards, reeds, flugelhorns, trumpets, trombone, bass trombone, violin, viola and cello.

Musical numbers

 Act I
 "Ain't Down Yet" - Company 
 "My Nose Ain't Broken" - Rocky 
 "Raining" - Adrian 
 "Patriotic" - Apollo Creed, Miles Jergens, Apollo Girls 
 "My Nose Ain't Broken (Reprise)" - Rocky 
 "The Flip Side" - Rocky, Adrian 
 "Adrian" - Rocky 
 "Wanna Know Why" - Gazzo, Buddy, Rocky, Mickey 
 "Fight From the Heart" - Rocky 
 "One of Us" - Company 

 Act II
 "Training Montage #1" - Company 
 "In the Ring" - Mickey 
 "Training Montage #2" - Company 
 "Happiness" - Rocky, Adrian 
 "I'm Done" - Adrian 
 "Southside Celebrity" - Company 
 "Adrian (Reprise)"- Adrian 
 "Keep On Standing" - Rocky 
 "Undefeated Man"- Apollo, Entourage 
 "The Fight" - Company

Recordings

Principal roles and original cast

Reception

Critical response
The Hamburg production of Rocky the Musical received positive reviews from critics.

Accolades

Original Broadway production

References

External links
 

2012 musicals
Musicals based on films
Rocky (film series) music
Musicals by Lynn Ahrens
Musicals by Stephen Flaherty
Musicals by Thomas Meehan (writer)
Klitschko brothers
Boxing music
Sports in art
Tony Award-winning musicals
Rocky (film series) mass media